The Mont Miné Glacier is a  long glacier (2005) in the Pennine Alps in the canton of Valais in Switzerland.

See also
List of glaciers in Switzerland
List of glaciers
Retreat of glaciers since 1850
Swiss Alps

External links
Swiss glacier monitoring network

Glaciers of Valais
Glaciers of the Alps
GMontmine